The Peace of Münster was a treaty between the Lords States General of the Seven United Netherlands and the Spanish Crown, the terms of which were agreed on 30 January 1648. The treaty, parallelly negotiated to but not part of the Peace of Westphalia, is a key event in Dutch history, marking the formal recognition of the independent Dutch Republic and the end of the Thirty Years' War and the Eighty Years' War.

Background

Negotiations 

Negotiations between began in 1641 in the towns of Münster and Osnabrück, in present-day Germany. With the initiation of Spanish-Dutch peace talks, Dutch trade with the Levant and the Iberian Peninsula began to flourish. Dutch merchants, benefiting from both the availability of relatively cheap shipping and the cessation of hostilities, soon dominated the markets that had been previously dominated by English traders. Dutch merchants would also benefit from the foreign upheavals of the English Civil War and gain on English trade in their American colonies.

While Spain did not recognise the Dutch Republic, it agreed that the Lords States General of the United Netherlands was 'sovereign' and could participate in the peace talks. In January 1646, eight Dutch representatives arrived in Münster to begin negotiations; these included two delegates from Holland with one each from the other six provinces. The Spanish envoys had been given great authority by the Spanish King Philip IV who had been suing for peace for years.

Start of peace negotiations

Spain's disadvantage

Outcome 
On 30 January 1648, the parties reached agreement and the text sent to the Hague and Madrid for approval; it was ratified by the Spanish and Dutch delegations on 15 May, with the States General narrowly approving the Treaty on 5 June 1648.

Despite achieving independence, there was considerable opposition to the Treaty within the States General since it allowed Spain to retain the Southern Provinces and permitted religious toleration for Catholics. Support from the powerful province of Holland meant it was narrowly approved but these differences resulted in political conflict.

Contents 
During the peace talks, negotiators representing the Republic and Spain reached an agreement relatively quickly. The text of the Twelve Years' Truce was taken as the foundation, and this made it a lot easier to formulate the peace treaty, because many articles could be copied without too many changes. If one compares the texts of the Twelve Years' Truce of 1609 to the Peace of Münster of 1648, the articles that correspond in whole or in part are as follows::

The States-General of the Dutch Republic were formally recognised by Spain as a sovereign entity. This important concession by Spain was therefore the first point; Spain stopped regarding the Republic's inhabitants as rebellious Spanish subjects (which it had done for 100 years). Peace seemed near. France, with which the Republic had agreed to come to a joint treaty with Spain, threw a spanner in the works by constantly coming up with new demands. The States then decided to conclude a separate peace with Spain without France. On 30 January 1648, the peace text was adopted in four copies, two in French and two in Dutch. The Utrecht delegate Nederhorst initially refused to put down his signature and seal, but after being forced to do so by his province, he put them on 30 April (although they no longer fit neatly on the document). Then the documents were sent to The Hague and Madrid for ratification. On 15 May 1648, the peace was definitively signed and solemnly ratified with an oath by Dutch and Spanish envoys, while a huge crowd was spectating the proceedings from the sidelines.

In the Netherlands, the National Archives in The Hague keeps two copies of the Peace of Münster, a Dutch-language one ("NL-HaNA 1.01.02 12588.55B"), and a Francophone version ("NL-HaNA 1.01.02 12588.55C"). Both versions are provided by the Spanish side with French-language ratifications, both signed by King Philip IV – one in Spanish with Yo el Rey ("I the King"), the other in French with Philippe ("Philip") – and both bearing his seal in solid gold. They are on display in the archive's exhibition room. The Archivo General de Simancas in Spain preserves the other Dutch-language copy ("ES.47161.AGS//EST,LEG,2943,27") and the other French-language copy ("ES.47161.AGS//EST,LEG,2943,28").

Further developments

See also
 Act of Abjuration
 Thirty Years' War
 Peace of Westphalia
 Eighty Years' War

Explanatory footnotes

References

Bibliography 
 Boer, H. W. J. de, H. Bruch en H. Krol (red.) Adriaan Pauw (1585–1653); staatsman en ambachtsheer. Heemstede, VOHB, 1985
  (in cooperation with H.L.Ph. Leeuwenberg and H.B. van der Weel)
 
 
 Manzano Baena, Laura (Winter 2007), "Negotiating Sovereignty: The Peace Treaty of Münster, 1648", History of Political Thought, Volume 28, Number 4, pp. 617–641. .
 
 Poelhekke, J. J. De vrede van Munster. 's-Gravenhage, Martinus Nijhoff, 1948.

External links 

 Scans from the National Archives (The Hague) of the Dutch-language version (12588.55B) of the Peace of Münster
 Scans from the National Archives (The Hague) of the French-language version (12588.55C) of the Peace of Münster
 Printed Latin and German translations of the original text of the Peace of Münster (30 January 1648)
 Tratado de Münster (1648) en español – Modern Spanish version

1648 in the Holy Roman Empire
Treaties of the Dutch Republic
Peace treaties of Spain
1648 in the Dutch Republic
1648 treaties
1648 in Spain
History of Münster
Eighty Years' War (1621–1648)
1648 in Europe
Dutch Republic–Spain relations
Thirty Years' War treaties